Large Apparatus studying Grand Unification and Neutrino Astrophysics or LAGUNA is or was a European project aimed to develop the next-generation, very large volume underground neutrino observatory. The detector should be much bigger and more sensitive than any previous detector, and make new discoveries in the field of particle and astroparticle physics. The project involves 21 European institutions in 10 European countries, and brings together over 100 scientists. As of 2011, the project was assessing the feasibility of developing the observatory-infrastructure and the observatory particle detectors themselves, as well as looking for a deployment site (seven candidates) in Europe. There have also been propositions of merging the project with similar international projects, like DUSEL.

In June 2011, the LAGUNA collaboration finished the Feasibility Studies of building the proposed neutrino detectors. The studies were paid for by the EU (€1.7 million). No further activity is known.

As of 2016, the LAGUNA project seems to be defunct. No further development has happened, and it is unclear if any development will happen. Also the similar DUSEL-project in the United States was cancelled. However, the neutrino-component of the DUSEL-project (the Long Baseline Neutrino Experiment, LBNE) was rebooted as the DUNE project. The construction of DUNE started in 2017 in Sanford Lab in South Dakota, USA with expected completion 2027. It is expected that, with DUNE under construction, the LAGUNA-project will not be constructed, especially because the DUNE-project was enlarged from a USA-only project into an international project that now comprises many of the researchers worldwide (especially American and European researchers) who work on the topic, thus making the case for LAGUNA construction weaker.

Detectors 
There were three possible detector technologies being studied, the MEMPHYS, GLACIER and LENA detectors, MEMPHYS being a water-based detector, GLACIER being liquid argon and LENA liquid scintillator-based. All the detectors work by observing the faint light and electric charge produced when a neutrino particle interacts with a nucleus of the liquid inside the detector. The detectors will be based deep underground (even 1.4 km deep) to filter the noise that is developed by the atmospheric and cosmic particles that bombard everything at the surface of the Earth. These noise particles do not penetrate the Earth at that depth, but the neutrinos that interact only weakly with normal matter do. The detectors will be huge in size, with the liquid target mass being of order 100 000 – 1 000 000 tons.

LENA 
LENA (Low Energy Neutrino Astronomy) is a liquid scintillation detector with a mass about 50 kton. Its cylindrical shaped tank with about 100 meters height and 30 meters diameter. The actual scintillation volume is surrounded by nylon barrier and buffer volume. Additionally the buffer volume is surrounded by a pure water volume. The detection mechanism of LENA will be the photomultiplier tubes, which are designed to cover partly the walls between buffer volume and water volume. The scintillation light produced in scintillation volume will be detected with those photomultiplier tubes. LENA's aim is to study low energy neutrinos originated by supernova explosions, Sun and Earth's interior.

Scientific goals 
The goals of the project were to: study the unification of all forces by observing proton decay (a very rare phenomenon expected to occur according to some Grand Unified Theory (GUT) models but never observed), study the galactic supernovae through neutrino-observations, study terrestrial and solar neutrinos (neutrinos are formed in nuclear processes), study the excess of matter over antimatter in the universe through observing neutrino oscillations in collaboration with CERN (that provides the neutrino-beams for the experiment; neutrinos are made in the CERN and the sent as underground beam for hundreds of kilometers through the Earth to the detectors).

Sites 
The candidate sites for the observatory were:
 Callio at Pyhäsalmi Mine (Finland)
 Fréjus Road Tunnel (France)
 Boulby Mine (United Kingdom)
 Umbria (this site requires a new cavern to be excavated, as in contrast to the other sites, this site is not an old mine) (Italy)
 SUNLAB (Sieroszowice UNderground LABoratory) in Polkowice-Sieroszowice mine (Poland)
 Unirea mine in Slănic (Romania)
 Canfranc Underground Laboratory (Spain)

From these candidates, the observatory location is chosen (See the project website  for more information about the sites).

References

External links

Neutrino experiments
International science experiments